Glyptogona is a genus of orb-weaver spiders first described by Eugène Simon in 1885.  it contains only two species.

References

Araneidae
Araneomorphae genera
Taxa named by Eugène Simon